is the first extended play by Puerto Rican singer Ricky Martin. It was released on May 28, 2020, through Sony Latin. Pausa is the first studio release by Martin since his 2015 studio album, A Quien Quiera Escuchar. Originally planned as a full-length album, Martin changed the concept following the spread of the COVID-19 pandemic and his experience with panic attacks. He split the album into two EP's, Pausa which consists of slower songs and ballads and Play which is set to include more up-tempo songs. The EP features six songs, out of which, five are collaborations with Sting, Carla Morrison, Pedro Capó and Bad Bunny among others.

Following its release, Pausa charted at number eight on the US Latin Pop Albums chart. It was promoted with two singles, "Cántalo", with Bad Bunny and Residente, and "Tiburones". The latter became Martin's 49th entry on US Hot Latin Songs charts, making him the first and only artist in history to enter the chart in five different decades. Additionally, it became his 50th entry on the US Latin Pop Airplay chart. Pausa was nominated for Album Of The Year and won Best Pop Vocal Album at the 21st Annual Latin Grammy Awards. It also has been nominated for Best Latin Pop or Urban Album at the 63rd Annual Grammy Awards.

Background and development 

In 2015 Martin released his tenth studio album, A Quien Quiera Escuchar. The album spawned four singles, including the international hit, "La Mordidita"; it became Martin's twenty-sixth top ten hit on the US Hot Latin Songs chart making him the fourth artist with the most top tens in the history of the chart. At the 58th Annual Grammy Awards, A Quien Quiera Escuchar won the award for Best Latin Pop Album. In 2016, Martin released, "Vente Pa' Ca", a collaboration with Colombian singer Maluma. It became Martin's 16th number-one single on the US Latin Airplay chart and topped the charts in eight other countries. Two years later, he released another collaboration, "Fiebre", featuring Wisin & Yandel; it received a platinum certification (Latin) from the Recording Industry Association of America (RIAA) for moving over 60,000 units in the US.

In January 2020, Martin announced the release of his eleventh studio album, initially titled Movimiento. The record was supposed to be inspired by Puerto Rico's recent history including Hurricane Maria in 2017, the 2019 political protests and the 2019–20 earthquakes. However, following the spread of COVID-19 pandemic, Martin started experiencing panic attacks, "I spent two weeks with a poker face so my family wouldn't be affected, but finally I was able to raise my head and say ‘eh, something very good has to come out of this, get creative.’ And I started making music and it was my medicine, honestly, because I really felt like I was gasping for air." Subsequently, he contacted his label, Sony, and decided to split the album in two extended plays, Pausa and Play. Martin described the former as more "chill" and "relaxed", while the latter will consist of more upbeat songs. Pausa was released on May 28, 2020, while Play would be slated for a September release, though the Play release did not occur yet. Martin's husband, Jwan Yosef, shot the artwork for Pausa; it features the singer's naked back.

Recording and composition 

Pausa consists of six songs, five out of which are collaborations. Musicians featured on the EP include, English singer Sting, Mexican singer-songwriter Carla Morrison, Spain Romani flamenco singer Diego el Cigala and Puerto Rican artists Pedro Capó, Residente and Bad Bunny. Regarding his collaboration with Morrison, Martin stated, "It's the singer's sound, her storytelling, her tone, the way she writes. I love her. I love her stories." Martin's sound engineer Enrique Larreal, based in New York, helped record the material with the other artists being based in London, Paris, Puerto Rico, and the Dominican Republic, "My engineer was able to create a system where everyone — my producer in Miami, me in L.A. — had a sharp, immaculate audiovisual experience. I can be recording and literally see in my laptop the movement he is making in his console table in New York." Inspired by the singer's fears, insecurities, and panic moments he experienced during quarantine, Griselda Flores of Billboard described the lyrics as "introspective", "poignant" and "melancholic".

The EP opens with "Simple" a collaboration with Sting, described by Flores as "simple yet forceful and grand". Martin contacted Sting who accepted the duet-offer and decided to sing in Spanish, "I [Martin] called him [Sting] stepping out of my comfort zone because I don't really like asking people and he said yes, to send him whatever I had and he liked what I sent him. It's a dream come true." "Recuerdo", the collaboration with Morrison, is an emotional song with "heart-wrenching" lyrics. According to Martin, the song came out of a rough moment and sadness he and Morisson were experiencing when they wrote it. Elias Leight of Rolling Stone, regarding "Recuerdo", wrote that the singers showcase "complementary vocal styles"; Morrison has more "light and lilting", while Martin opts for a "creamier, more forceful approach".

"Cae de Una", a duet with Capó, has an "infectious" beat, with a light melodic tune and "heartbreak" lyrical content. "Quiéreme" is a "flamenco-tinged" pop song and was co-produced by Spanish musician Raül Refree in Barcelona. Refree turned the melody to "an explosion of sounds" on which Martin and Cigala trade "dramatic and powerful vocals". "Tiburones" is an emotional ballad co-written by Pablo Preciado and Oscar Hernandez. It contains deep lyrics that advocate for peace, love, unity, and acceptance. "Cántalo" is the only exception on the album tempo-wise and features a variety of genres including salsa, reggaeton and trap. It is based on the original master of Hector Lavoe's 1974 song, "Mi Gente". A collaboration with Residente and Bad Bunny, it was inspired by the #RickyRenuncia movement (a campaign against former Puerto Rican governor, Ricardo Rosselló) and includes lyrics like, "Nobody stops us today/ Not even with elephant soothing/ Money, although abundant, it is not worth."

Singles 

"Cántalo" was released as the first single from Pausa on November 12, 2019. Its artwork was inspired by the protest posters issued in Puerto Rico during the riots that demanded the resignation of Roselló. Commercially, it reached number 35 on the US Hot Latin Songs chart and was certified Latin gold by the RIAA, for moving over 30,000 units in the country. Martin alongside Residente and Bad Bunny performed "Cántalo" at the 20th Annual Latin Grammy Awards held on November 14, 2019 in Las Vegas.

"Tiburones" was released on January 23, 2020, as the second single from the EP. It became Martin's 49th entry on US Hot Latin Songs charts, where it peaked at number 34 in May 2020. With this feat, he became the first and only artist in history to enter the chart in five different decades. "Tiburones" also became the singer's 50th entry on the Latin Pop Airplay. It peaked at number nine and became Martin's 38th top-ten single on the chart. Additionally, topped the Monitor Latino singles chart in Puerto Rico for three consecutive weeks and reached the top 10 in nine other countries. Kacho Lopez filmed the music video for the song in Puerto Rico. According to Martin, "Both the song and the video embody all the emotions, energy and feel, which are emblematic of when we come together as people." Martin performed the song at the Lo Nuestro Awards on February 20, 2020. The song was nominated for "Song Of the Year" at the 21st Annual Latin Grammy Awards where Martin also gave it a performance along with his song "Recuerdo". An official remix of "Tiburones", featuring singer Farruko, was released on April 10, 2020.

On July 23, 2020, "Recuerdo" released as the only promotional single from the extended play. Billboard picked the song as one of the Best Female/Male Latin Collaborations of 2020 and one of the most beautiful ballads released that year. The song reached the top 10 in Martin's native Puerto Rico and became his third top 10 hit in the country from his EP.

Critical reception

Griselda Flores from Billboard gave the extended play a positive review, saying: "Packed with introspective, poignant and melancholic lyrics, the six-track set is born from a state of vulnerability and the need to heal through music."

It was also ranked as one of the Best Latin Albums of 2020 by Billboard.

Awards and nominations

Track listing

Notes
  signifies a vocal producer

Personnel 

Ricky Martin – composer, executive producer, producer, writer, vocals
Alberto Lozada Algarín – composer, producer, writer
Ender Zambrano – composer, writer
Sting – composer, writer, vocals
Carla Patricia Morrison Flores – writer, vocals
Alejandro Jimenez – composer, recording engineer, vocal producer, writer 
Demian Jimenez – composer, writer
Chiara Stroia – composer
Jean Rodríguez – vocal producer
Pedro Capó – composer, vocals, writer
Gabriel Edgar "Rec808" González Pérez – composer, guitar, recording engineer, writer
Julio Reyes Copello – keyboards, performance arranger, programmer, producer, recording engineer
Nicolas "Na 'vi" de la Espriella –  keyboards, performance arranger, programmer, producer, recording engineer
George Noriega – vocal producer
Beatriz Luengo – composer, writer
Yotuel Romero – composer, writer
Diego el Cigala – vocals
Raül Refree – acoustic guitar, programmer, producer, recording engineer, synthesizer, 
Oscar Hernández – writer
Pablo Preciado – writer
Natalia Ramírez – vocal producer
Benito Antonio "Bad Bunny" Martínez Ocasio – vocals, writer
René "Residente" Pérez – composer, producer, vocals, writer
Danay Suárez – background vocals, composer, writer
Rubén Blades – writer
Johnny Pacheco – writer
Trooko – producer, recording engineer
Rafa Arcaute – recording engineer
José Ricardo Lugo – bass
Carlos Valencia – cello
Jorge Laboy – guitar
Felipe Tichauer – mastering engineer
Gustavo Celis – mixing engineer
Richard Bravo – percussion
Héctor Iván Rosao – recording engineer
Karlo Floreso – violin
Bart Schoudelo – vocal engineer
Christian J. Pérez – vocal engineer
Donal Hodgson – vocal engineer
Enrique Larreal – recording engineer, vocal engineer
Francisco "Paco" Aldonado – assistant engineer
Jaycen Joshua – mixing engineer
Ela Taubert – background vocals, percussion
Natalia Schlesinger – background vocals, percussion, recording engineer
Daniel Uribe – guitar, recording engineer
Nicolás Ramírez – percussion, recording engineer
Yamil Otero – viola
Alen Saucedo – vocal engineer
Alberto Sánchez – vocal engineer
Matt Tuggle – assistant engineer
Dan Warner – guitar
Gene Grimaldi – mastering engineer
Trevor Muzzy – mixing engineer
Carlos Fernando López – performance arranger, recording engineer
Manuela López Lambuley – violloncelo 
Carmela Ramírez – background vocals
Rubén Blades – background vocals
Tito Allen – background vocals
Ted Jensen – mastering engineer
Tom Elmhirst – mixing engineer
Leo Genovese – piano
Luis Quintero – timbales
Rey Alejandre – trombone

Charts

Release history

References 

2020 EPs
Ricky Martin EPs
Sony Music Latin EPs
Spanish-language EPs
Albums produced by Julio Reyes Copello
Latin Grammy Award for Best Pop Vocal Album